Senator Babbitt may refer to:

Elijah Babbitt (1795–1887), Pennsylvania State Senate
Frederick H. Babbitt (1859–1931), Vermont State Senate